This is about the album.  For the phrase, see Ewige Blumenkraft.

Blumenkraft is the debut album by British musician Ott. It was released in May 2003 on Twisted Records. The title of the album is a word by word translation of the phrase "flower power" into German. The track "Splitting an Atom" uses vocal samples from the Scottish song "Ailein duinn".

Track listing
 "Jack's Cheese and Bread Snack"  – 12:52
 "Somersettler"  – 7:31
 "Splitting an Atom"  – 7:21
 "Escape from Tulse Hell"  – 7:12
 "Cley Hill"  – 7:32
 "Billy the Kid Strikes Back"  – 7:13
 "A Load Up at Nunney Catch"  – 7:18
 "Spannered in Pilton"  – 7:07
 "Smoked Glass and Chrome"  – 8:34
 *"Ott Come Out and Play" (hidden intro track accessed by rewinding track 1 on CD into negatives)

References

2003 debut albums
Ott (record producer) albums